IKD may refer to:

 International Communists of Germany (Internationalen Kommunisten Deutschlands)
 Iran Khodro Diesel